The Battle of Peñacerrada, a battle of the First Carlist War, occurred at Peñacerrada (Urizaharra) on June 20–22, 1838.  The Liberals were commanded by Pedro Saarsfield and Manuel Lorenzo, who had crossed the Ebro after the Battle of Los Arcos.  They routed 1,500 Carlist troops situated at Peñecerrada.  Saarsfield and Lorenzo entered Vitoria-Gasteiz and Bilbao within a week without encountering resistance.

External links
Carlist: 1833-40 Chronology

Peñacerrada
Peñacerrada
1838 in Europe
1838 in Spain
Peñacerrada
June 1838 events